The 2018 Northern Mariana Islands general election were held on Tuesday, November 13, 2018, corresponding with the 2018 United States midterm elections. Originally scheduled to take place on Tuesday, November 6, 2018, the elections were delayed by one week due to the impact and aftermath of Typhoon Yutu. Early voting was held from Tuesday, November 6, until Monday, November 12, 2018. An estimated 18,975 voters were eligible to vote in the 2018 election.

Ninety-seven candidates competed for 45 elected positions across the Northern Mariana Islands. High-profile races included the 2018 gubernatorial election between incumbent governor Ralph Torres, a Republican, and former governor Juan Babauta, as well as the race for non-voting delegate to the United States House of Representatives between incumbent Gregorio Sablan and challenger Angel Demapan.

References

 
2018 in the Northern Mariana Islands